KCUW-LP (104.3 FM) is a radio station licensed to Pendleton, Oregon, United States.  The station is currently owned by Confederated Tribes of the Umatilla Indian Reservation.

History
The station was assigned the call letters KUIR-LP on February 11, 2003.  On October 15, 2003, the station changed its call sign to the current KCUW-LP.

See also
List of community radio stations in the United States

References

External links
 

CUW-LP
CUW-LP
Pendleton, Oregon
Native American radio
Community radio stations in the United States